Reward, also known as Williams Point Farm, is a historic home located at Shelltown, Somerset County, Maryland, United States. It is a -story, gable-front brick dwelling with a steep gable roof with two diamond-shaped chimney stacks piercing the east slope of the roof. The main block is constructed of whitewashed brick laid in Flemish bond.

Reward was listed on the National Register of Historic Places in 1974.

References

External links
, including undated photo, at Maryland Historical Trust

Houses in Somerset County, Maryland
Houses on the National Register of Historic Places in Maryland
Houses completed in 1794
National Register of Historic Places in Somerset County, Maryland
1794 establishments in Maryland